Top Hero is a 1994 Telugu-language drama film, produced by Mulpuri Venkatrao and Achanta Gopinath under the Sri Chitra Creations banner and directed by S. V. Krishna Reddy. It stars Nandamuri Balakrishna, Soundarya and its music was composed by S. V. Krishna Reddy.

Plot 
Balu a robust always aids the needy with minimal charges and crushes with a beautiful Chitra. Besides, Madhusudhan Rao, a tycoon turned insane in an accident. As a result, his benevolent wife Rohini faces troubles with her sly brother Dasu that has been jailed by them. Ergo, to seek vengeance clutches all her kids. Firstly, he lures the elder son-in-law Sagar via prostitute Vasantha and weeps the daughter Raji. Likewise, she intrudes into the home and takes over authority. As well as, the younger two are enticed by Dasu’s progeny. Plus, Rohini is jeopardized by a malign Jalarakshasudu. During that plight, she walks for Balu to facilitate her and requests him to show up as her elder son which he does so. Since he has gratitude toward Rohini as she supported his mother’s rites in childhood. 

Now, Balu sets foot into the house, when he receives rebuff from the family members but thresholds it with patience. Here, Balu gets startled viewing Madhusudhan Rao. Considering, he is the one that rescued him while a few of the goons attempted to murder which is the true cause of his current state. Anyhow, Rohini states it is an accident thereby, Balu discerns she is covering the fact. Further, he spots her stopping medication to Madhusudhan Rao to be lunatic and comprehends something fishy. Step by step, Balu dissolves household hardships, rectifies the kindred, acquires their affection, and checkmates to Dasu. Further, he recoups Madhusudhan Rao with adequate treatment and he too accepts Balu as his elder one. 

At that point, he questions Rohini's underlying reason then she divulges the past. Once, Madhusudhan Rao witnessed a crime committed by Jalarakshasudu which he picturizes and hides. So, she thinks Madhusudhan Rao is safer as long as he is insane because Jalarakshasudu slaughters him right after his recovery. As of today, Balu words Rohini to shield her husband from the bloodthirsty. Being cognizant of the current state through Dasu, Jalarakshasudu abducts Madhusudhan Rao to learn the whereabouts of the evidence. At last, Balu ceases the baddies and safeguards Madhusudhan Rao. Finally, the movie ends on a happy note with the marriage of Balu & Chitra.

Cast

Nandamuri Balakrishna as Balu
Soundarya as Chitra
Rohini Hattangadi as Rohini
Mahesh Anand as Jala Rakshasudu
Kota Srinivasa Rao as Dasu
Brahmanandam as S.I. Satya Murthy
Ali as Akkum Bakkum
AVS as Madhusudana Rao
Tanikella Bharani as Gurunatham
Mallikarjuna Rao as Chitra's father
Gundu Hanumantha Rao as Constable Gundu
Kishore Rathi as Doctor
Vidya Sagar as Sagar
Sivaji Raja as Ravi
Sriman as Dasu's son
Sakshi Ranga Rao as Classical Singer
Subbaraya Sharma as S.P.
Jenny as Doctor
Kinnera as Kinnera
Rajeswari as Raji 
Archana as Gayatri
Radha Prashanthi 
Krishnaveni as Vasantha
Master Baladitya as Aditya
Aamani as an item number "O Muddu Papa" (Cameo appearance)

Soundtrack

 Hindi Version
" Duniya Mein Teri" - N/A
"Ek Baar Mujhe Bulayegi" - N/A
"Lage Jab Se Naina" - N/A
"Pyar Ki Dil Mein Aag Lagi Hai" - Kumar Sanu, Kavita Krishnamurthy
"Pyari Baby O Pyari Baby" - Kumar Sanu
"Smoking Is Injurous To Health" - N/A

Other
 VCDs and DVDs on - VOLGA Videos, Hyderabad

References

External links
 

1994 films
Films directed by S. V. Krishna Reddy
Films scored by S. V. Krishna Reddy
1990s Telugu-language films